The 2018–19 Austin Peay Governors men's basketball team represented Austin Peay State University during the 2018–19 NCAA Division I men's basketball season. The Governors, led by second-year head coach Matt Figger, played their home games at the Dunn Center in Clarksville, Tennessee as members of the  Ohio Valley Conference. 22–11 overall, 13–5 in OVC play to finish in fourth place. In the OVC tournament, they defeated Morehead State in the quarterfinals before losing to Belmont in the semifinals.

Previous season 
The Governors finished the 2017–18 season 19–15, 12–6 in OVC play to finish in third place. They defeated Eastern Illinois in the quarterfinals of the OVC tournament before losing in the semifinals to Belmont. They were invited to the CollegeInsider.com Tournament where they defeated Louisiana–Monroe in the first round, a game referred to as the Coach John McLendon Classic, and received a second round bye before losing in the quarterfinals to UIC.

Roster

Schedule and results

|-
!colspan=9 style=| Non-conference regular Season

|-
!colspan=9 style=| Ohio Valley Conference regular season

|-
!colspan=9 style="|Ohio Valley Conference tournament

References

Austin Peay Governors men's basketball seasons
Austin Peay
Austin Peay
Austin Peay